Cyril Oliver Litterick was an Australian rules footballer who was highly successful in the West Australian National Football League (WANFL) playing for the Swan Districts Football Club. He was regarded as a formidable ruckman and able to kick goals while resting in the forward pocket. Litterick was recruited by Swan Districts in 1958 (the same year that Fred Castledine joined) from East Perth Football Club. Besides being a highly regarded football player, Litterick was also a police officer in the West Australian Police Force.

References

Australian police officers
Swan Districts Football Club players
Australian rules footballers from Western Australia
1937 births
1986 deaths